The Tasmania SuperSprint (formally known as the NED Whisky Tasmania SuperSprint) is an annual motor racing event for Supercars, held at Symmons Plains Raceway in Launceston, Tasmania. The event has been a regular part of the Supercars Championship—and its previous incarnations, the Australian Touring Car Championship, Shell Championship Series and V8 Supercars Championship—since 1969.

Behind Sandown Raceway, which has most commonly hosted the Sandown 500 and Sandown SuperSprint, Symmons Plains has hosted the most events in championship history with 49 as of 2022. Prior to the COVID-19 pandemic, the only hiatus for the event was between 2000 and 2003 during which the circuit received a A$3 million upgrade. The event is seen as one of Tasmania's largest sporting events, providing a variety of benefits to the local economy.

Format
The event is staged over a two-day weekend, from Saturday to Sunday. Two thirty-minute practice sessions are held on Saturday, then a single qualifying session which decides the grid positions for the following 100 kilometre race. Two separated ten-minute qualifying sessions are held on Sunday, which decide the grid for the following 100 km races.

History
When the Australian Touring Car Championship (ATCC) was first held over a series of races in 1969, Symmons Plains was included on the calendar as the final race of the series. The race would decide the championship that year, as Alan Hamilton could take the title from Ian Geoghegan if he won the race and Geoghegan failed to score. Geoghegan's car failed to start at the one-minute signal and his pit crew push started the car. This was not allowed under the regulations of the time and Geoghegan was disqualified. Hamilton ended up finishing the race in second place behind Norm Beechey, losing the title to Geoghegan by a single point. After again hosting the final round in 1970, Symmons Plains became the home of the opening round, hosting the first event of the ATCC every year from 1971 to 1981. Allan Moffat and Peter Brock were the most successful drivers at the event in this period, taking seven of the eleven possible victories between them. John Harvey also scored his only two ATCC victories at the event, winning in 1976 and 1979.

In 1985, Robbie Francevic won his and Volvo's first round victory, winning again in 1986. Between 1988 and 1990, Dick Johnson joined Moffat as the only two drivers to win three consecutive rounds at the circuit. In 1993, 1980 Formula One World Champion Alan Jones won his first ATCC round, despite a clash with Mark Skaife which led to a confrontation after the race. In the late 1990s, Holden Racing Team dominated the event with four consecutive round wins from 1996 to 1999. During this period, the Symmons Plains event remained in the early part of the ATCC calendar until 1999, when it was moved to August. The Government of Tasmania didn't renew the event's contract after 1999 and the race dropped off the calendar in 2000.

Following the completion of a circuit upgrade in 2004, which included the construction of permanent pit lane facilities and a resurfacing of the track, a new deal was struck to bring the event back onto the calendar in November of the same year. Tasmanian driver Marcos Ambrose went into the 2004 event attempting to seal a back-to-back championship victory, until an engine failure in the third and final race of the weekend delayed his coronation as champion. David Besnard and three other drivers benefited from a fortuitous late-race safety car to jump to the front of the field, before the four drivers were then demoted to the back of the field at a subsequent safety car due to confusion regarding the standings. Several days later, Besnard was credited with the win, the only win for WPS Racing. Initially on its return, the event was generally held towards the end of the season, often as the penultimate event, until a move to the early stages of the championship calendar in 2012.

Between 2007 and 2015, Jamie Whincup and Triple Eight Race Engineering dominated the event with six wins. This has seen Whincup surpass Brock as the most successful driver in the event's history. In 2013, Fabian Coulthard won Brad Jones Racing their first championship round, winning two races with team-mate Jason Bright winning the other. In 2017, the Saturday race was suspended after two laps due to a twelve car pile-up in wet conditions. While the race later briefly restarted under safety car, no championship points were awarded due to the short distance completed, however Shane van Gisbergen was still credited with a race victory. In 2018, a three-stage knockout qualifying system was introduced to the championship at Symmons Plains to reduce the risks of traffic. Craig Lowndes won the round, his last round win as a solo driver, and his first at the circuit since 1998.

The 2020 event was postponed until November to the COVID-19 pandemic, before later being cancelled altogether.

Winners

Multiple winners

By driver

By team

By manufacturer 

 Notes
  – DJR Team Penske was known as Dick Johnson Racing from 1980 to 2014, hence their statistics are combined.

Event names and sponsors
 1969–85, 1987–99, 2004: Symmons Plains
 1986: A.N.L. Cup
 2005–06: Ferodo Triple Challenge
 2006: Ferodo Tasmania Challenge
 2007–12: Falken Tasmania Challenge
 2013: Tasmania Microsoft Office 365
 2014: Tyrepower Tasmania 400
 2015–19: Tyrepower Tasmania SuperSprint
 2021: Beaurepaires Tasmania SuperSprint
 2022–: NED Whisky Tasmania SuperSprint

See also
 List of Australian Touring Car Championship races

References

External links
 2015 event page

Supercars Championship races
Motorsport in Tasmania